Acid Eaters is the thirteenth studio album by American punk rock band Ramones.

Released in 1993, towards the end of the Ramones' career, the album is the band's first and only album entirely composed of covers. Acid Eaters forms a musical tribute to the Ramones' favorite artists of the 1960s and highlights the influences the Ramones took from garage rock bands like the Seeds and the Amboy Dukes, as well as from popular bands such as the Beach Boys, the Who and the Rolling Stones (all of whom are covered on this album).

Background
Although Acid Eaters is specifically made of covers from the sixties, it was not the first time that the Ramones had played or recorded cover songs, with the band having released cover versions on most of their albums, almost all or them from the sixties, starting with a cover of Chris Montez's hit "Let's Dance" (written by and credited to Jim Lee) on their debut album. Other notable covers previously performed by the group include: the Rivieras' "California Sun" (originally recorded by Joe Jones); the Beach Boys' "Do You Wanna Dance?" (originally recorded by Bobby Freeman); the Trashmen's "Surfin' Bird"; the Searchers' "Needles and Pins" (written by Sonny Bono and Jack Nitzsche, originally recorded by Jackie DeShannon); the Ronettes' "Baby, I Love You"; the Music Explosion's "Little Bit O' Soul"; the Chambers Brothers' "Time Has Come Today"; Freddy Cannon's "Palisades Park"; and the Doors' "Take It as It Comes." Jan and Dean's "Surf City" had been performed live by the Ramones on one occasion on August 20, 1982, in New York City, but makes its studio debut here.

Production
In his 2012 autobiography Commando, Johnny Ramone called the album "hit-and-miss," stating that many of the songs "were done with studio work, arrangements, and tricks, which was really different for us", and that the band "experimented to mixed success." He added that "we were getting all kinds of suggestions from everybody, and it was getting to be a pain in the ass. I mean, 'She's Not There' by the Zombies?" Johnny awarded the album a "B−" grade. Bassist C.J. Ramone gave the album a "D" grade, saying that it was done strictly for the money.

The album features several guest singers on backing vocals, namely Pete Townshend on "Substitute," Sebastian Bach on "Out of Time" and Traci Lords on "Somebody to Love." According to Johnny Ramone, while he considered Townshend "one of the greats and one of my guitar heroes", Townshend was a half an hour late for his session, resulting in Johnny giving up and leaving the studio to watch a Yankee game.

According to C.J. Ramone, Acid Eaters was only going to be an EP before manager Gary Kurfirst promised a bigger advance as well as a bigger cut if they made it a full release.

Promotion
The band promoted the album on the animated Cartoon Network talk show Space Ghost Coast to Coast, in the first season episode entitled "Bobcat".

Track listing

Personnel 

Ramones
 Joey Ramone – lead vocals (tracks 2, 3, 5–7, 9–13)
 Johnny Ramone – guitar
 Marky Ramone – drums
 C.J. Ramone – bass guitar, lead vocals (tracks 1, 4, 8)

Additional musicians
 Joe McGinty – keyboards
 Pete Townshend – backing vocals (track 2)
 Sebastian Bach – backing vocals (track 3)
 Traci Lords – backing vocals (track 5)

Technical
 Scott Hackwith – producer, mixing
 Gary Kurfirst – executive producer
 Trent Slatton – engineer, mixing
 Bryce Goggin – assistant engineer (Baby Monster)
 Rojo – assistant engineer (Baby Monster)
 Johnny Wydrycs – assistant engineer (Chung King)
 Jack Hersca – assistant engineer (Chung King)
 Diego Garrido – assistant engineer (Chung King)
 Peter Beckerman – assistant engineer (Sound on Sound)
 Scott Hull – mastering

Charts

Certifications

References 

Album chart usages for Sweden
Album chart usages for Canada
Album chart usages for Billboard200
Ramones albums
1993 albums
Chrysalis Records albums
Covers albums
Radioactive Records albums